The 2023 Guildford Borough Council election is scheduled to take place on 4 May 2023 to elect members of Guildford Borough Council in England. This is on the same day as other local elections.

Boundary Changes
The election will be contested on new ward boundaries, due to a periodic review by the Local Government Boundary Commission for England. The council size will remain unchanged at 48 councillors.

Guildford Town

The boundary changes resulted in the abolition of Holy Trinity, Friary & St Nicolas and Christchurch wards in the town centre. St Nicolas was split off to become a new single-member ward. A new three-member Castle ward replaced most of Holy Trinity ward, and a new three-member ward named Stoke replaced most of the Friary area of Friary & St Nicolas ward. The area covered by the former Christchurch ward was split between the new Stoke and Castle wards and also between Burpham and Merrow wards, the latter of which were both expanded in the direction of the town centre. Elsewhere in the town the ward formerly known as Stoke kept the same boundaries but was renamed as Bellfields & Slyfield with the 'Stoke' name being transferred to the new town centre ward. The ward of Stoughton was split into Stoughton North and Stoughton South, both two-member wards. Westborough ward had its boundary with Onslow adjusted to follow the A3 and the railway line, and also had its boundary with Stoughton South adjusted to largely follow the Aldershot Road. Onslow had its boundary with Stoke and St Nicolas adjusted to follow Farnham Road and the railway line.

Western Villages

Worplesdon ward remained completely unchanged. Normandy ward and Pirbright ward were merged to create a new two-member Normandy & Pirbright ward. Ash South & Tongham was split into a new two-member Ash South ward, which has an adjusted boundary with Ash Wharf, and the Tongham area was moved into Pilgrims ward, making it a two-member ward. The boundary between Ash Vale and Ash Wharf was moved to north of Foxhurst Road cul-de-sac. Shalford ward's boundaries were unchanged.

Eastern Villages

Effingham, Tillingbourne, and Clandon & Horsley wards remained completely unchanged. Send ward and Lovelace ward were merged to create a new three-member Send & Lovelace ward.

Background
There have been changes to the political make up of the council since the 2019 election. In the May 2021 local elections three by-elections were held simultaneously to fill vacancies on the council (two due to resignations, one due to the death of a councillor). However, each seat was won by the same party that won it at the 2019 election. Subsequently, in November 2021, a Liberal Democrat councillor defected to the Conservatives, but defected from the Conservatives to sit as an Independent in July 2022. A Conservative councillor died in May 2022 and the subsequent by-election was won by the Liberal Democrats. In November 2022 an R4GV councillor left his group to sit as an Independent. Additionally, the sole Green party councillor chose to sit as part of the R4GV group on the council shortly after the May 2019 election, but continued to be a Green party councillor, before leaving the R4GV group in October 2022 to sit alone as a Green party councillor again.

The cumulative impact of these changes resulted in the Liberal Democrats having 17 councillors, R4GV having 14, the Conservatives having 8, GGG having 4, Labour having 2, 2 Independent councillors and the Green party having 1.

Going in to the election, the council administration consists of a Liberal Democrat/R4GV coalition, with the Conservatives forming the main opposition party.

References

Guildford
Guildford Borough Council elections
21st century in Surrey